Nikolay Nikolayevich Krasilnikov (born 22 January 1927, Irkutsk, USSR) is a Russian scientist and educator in the fields of image transmission, image compression and human visual system.

Education
Krasilnikov graduated from the Leningrad Polytechnic Institute in 1950. He earned his Kandidat Nauk (equal to PhD) degree in 1952 and Doktor nauk degree in 1963.

Career
Krasilnikov has worked in Leningrad Institute of Aviation Instrumentation (now Saint Petersburg State University of Aerospace Instrumentation) since 1954. He was head of the Department of Radio transmitting and Television systems in 1957-1994. Under his leadership, department cooperated with leading institutions in USSR in the field of image processing and digital television. One of the first digital television systems in Europe was developed in cooperation with All-union Television Research Institute in the beginning of the 1970s. As a scientist he developed functional model of human visual system, based on the conception of matched filtering and statistical theory of image transmission.

Awards and recognition 
 The Russian Federation Government Prize in education (2009)

References 

Russian neuroscientists
Living people
1927 births
Soviet neuroscientists